Cytoskeleton is a peer-reviewed scientific journal covering cytoskeletal research. The journal publishes original research pertaining to cell motility and cytoskeletons, spanning genetic and cell biological observations, biochemical, biophysical and structural studies, mathematical modeling, and theory. It was established in 1980 as  Cell Motility. From 1989 to 2009 it was named Cell Motility and the Cytoskeleton, before obtaining its current name in 2010. The editor-in-chief is Patricia Wadsworth (University of Massachusetts Amherst). According to the Journal Citation Reports, the journal has a 2020 impact factor of 2.141, ranking it 169th out of 195 journals in the category "Cell Biology".

References

External links 
 

Publications established in 1980
Molecular and cellular biology journals
Wiley-Liss academic journals
English-language journals
Monthly journals